Flagmount is a combination of two townlands located within the barony of Gowran and on the R712 National primary road, (formerly the N10 National Primary Route) in County Kilkenny, Ireland. It is located in Gowran civil parish.

History
It was the southernmost point of territory of the Ó Cearbhaill part of Ely O'Carroll in Éile.

Transportation
The M9 motorway between Dublin and Waterford which passes through Flagmount was opened in September 2010. 
The new bridge crossing over the motorway was opened to traffic in March 2010.

See also
List of townlands in County Kilkenny
List of towns and villages in Ireland

Notes

References

Further reading
 
 
 
 
 
 
 
 
 
 
 
 
 
 
 }

External links
 
 
 
 

Townlands of County Kilkenny